Crisis in Utopia is the debut album of heavy metal band Holy Grail.

Track listing

Personnel
Holy Grail
James Paul Luna - vocals
Tyler Meahl - drums
Blake Mount - bass
Eli Santana - guitars, vocals
James J. LaRue - guitars

Additional Personnel
Andrei Bouzikov - cover art
Scott Hull - mastering
Mark Lewis - mixing
Matt Appleton - engineering
Danny Lohner - producer, engineering
Carson Slovak - layout
Anna Murphy - additional instrumentation
Meri Tadic - additional instrumentation

References 

2010 debut albums
Holy Grail (band) albums
Prosthetic Records albums
Albums produced by Danny Lohner